WCA may refer to:

Schools
 Waterbury Career Academy, public high school in Waterbury, Connecticut
 Wake Christian Academy, private Christian school in Raleigh, North Carolina
 Washington Christian Academy, private Christian school in Silver Spring, Maryland
 Wesleyan Christian Academy, private school in High Point, North Carolina
 Westminster Christian Academy (Missouri), private school in Town and Country, Missouri
 Wildwood Catholic Academy, private school in North Wildwood, New Jersey

Governing and political bodies
 Waste collection authority, local authority charged with collecting waste in the United Kingdom
 Welsh Canoeing Association, governing body for canoeing and kayaking in Wales
 World Clown Association, governing worldwide clowning
 World Cube Association, governing Rubik's Cube competitions
 World Council of Arameans, governing the Arameans worldwide

Professional associations
 World Chiropractic Alliance, agency which involves itself in chiropractic matters

Technical
 Water cascade analysis
 Weakly coordinating anion, or non-coordinating anion

Other
 Wesleyan Covenant Association, an organization associated with the Global Methodist Church
 Western Canada Airways Ltd., a defunct Canadian airline of the 1920s and 1930s
 West Caribbean Airways, a Colombian airline
 Wikimedia Chapters Association, an organization that coordinates works of all Wikimedia chapters
 Wind Correction Angle, used in aeronautical navigation
 Work Capability Assessment, an approach to judging an unemployed person's suitability for work, England, present.
 World Coal Association, previously known as World Coal Institute
 World Counter-terrorism Agency, a fictional organization appearing in Marvel Comics
 World Cube Association, the world speedcubing association